Janet Ann Moore  (5 February 1880 – 11 January 1968) was a New Zealand civilian and army nurse, nursing administrator, and hospital matron. She was born in Hanley Castle, Worcestershire, England, on 5 February 1880.

In the 1939 New Year Honours, Moore was appointed a Member of the Order of the British Empire.

References

1880 births
1968 deaths
New Zealand nurses
People from Malvern Hills District
New Zealand women nurses
New Zealand Members of the Order of the British Empire
English emigrants to New Zealand